Maria Selina Hale (23 May 1864–5 March 1951) was a New Zealand tailor, trade unionist and senior public servant. She was born in Glasgow, Lanarkshire, Scotland on 23 May 1864.  she had never worked in a factory. She was active in the Dunedin Tailoresses’ Union from about 1898, becoming its fifth secretary as well as secretary of the National Federation of Tailoresses' Unions in July 1901. She has a special contribution to prepare cases for the Court of Arbitration in 1900, 1902, 1905 and 1907 and there was an involvement in the negotiations which resulted in the abolition in practicing piecework system and the institution of set wages for journey-women.

References

1864 births
1951 deaths
New Zealand trade unionists
New Zealand public servants
Scottish emigrants to New Zealand